Alice Doesn't Live Here Anymore is a 1974 American comedy drama film directed by Martin Scorsese and written by Robert Getchell.  It stars Ellen Burstyn as a widow who travels with her preteen son across the Southwestern United States in search of a better life. Kris Kristofferson, Billy "Green" Bush, Diane Ladd, Valerie Curtin, Lelia Goldoni, Vic Tayback, Jodie Foster, Alfred Lutter and Harvey Keitel appear in supporting roles.

The film premiered at the 27th Cannes Film Festival, where it competed for the Palme d'Or, and was released theatrically on December 9, 1974, by Warner Bros. The film was a critical and commercial success, grossing $21 million on a $1.8 million budget. At the 47th Academy Awards, Burstyn won Best Actress, while Ladd and Getchell received nominations for Best Supporting Actress and Best Original Screenplay.

Plot 
In Socorro, New Mexico, housewife Alice Hyatt's husband, Donald, is killed in a car crash. Alice decides to have a garage sale, pack her remaining belongings, and take her son Tommy to her childhood hometown of Monterey, California, where she hopes to pursue the singing career she abandoned when she married.

Their financial situation forces them to take temporary lodgings in Phoenix, Arizona, where she finds work as a lounge singer in a seedy bar. There she meets Ben, who is younger and charms her into a sexual relationship that comes to a sudden end when his wife, Rita, confronts Alice. Ben breaks into Alice's apartment while Rita is there and physically assaults Rita in front of Alice for interfering with his extramarital affair. When Alice tells Ben to calm down, he also threatens Alice and continues to smash up the apartment. Fearing for their safety (and unable to afford repairs), Alice and Tommy quickly leave town.

Having spent most of the little money she earned on a new wardrobe, Alice is forced to delay her journey to the West Coast and accept a job as a waitress in Tucson so she can accumulate more cash. At the local diner, owned by a man named Mel, she eventually bonds with her fellow servers – independent, no-nonsense, outspoken Flo and quiet, timid, incompetent Vera – and meets divorced local rancher David, who is instantly attracted to Alice. David soon realizes the way to Alice's heart is through Tommy.

Alice is initially hesitant to get involved with another man so quickly. However, she finds out that David is a good influence on Tommy, who has befriended wisecracking, shoplifting, Ripple-guzzling Audrey, a slightly older girl forced to fend for herself while her mother makes a living as a prostitute.

Alice warily falls in love with David, but their relationship is threatened when Alice objects to his discipline of Tommy. The two reconcile, and David offers to sell his ranch and move to Monterey so Alice can try to fulfil her childhood dream of becoming another Alice Faye. In the end, Alice decides to stay in Tucson, concluding that she can become a singer anywhere.

Cast 
 Ellen Burstyn as Alice Hyatt (née Graham), a woman in her thirties who once worked as a singer
 Mia Bendixsen as 8-year-old Alice
 Alfred Lutter as Tommy Hyatt, Alice's obnoxious preteen son
 Kris Kristofferson as David, a regular customer of Mel and Ruby's Cafe
 Billy "Green" Bush as Donald Hyatt, a truck driver, Alice's husband
 Diane Ladd as Florence Jean ("Flo") Castleberry, a hardened, sharp-tongued waitress
 Valerie Curtin as Vera Gorman, a shy, awkward waitress
 Lelia Goldoni as Bea, Alice's friend and neighbor in Socorro
 Lane Bradbury as Rita
 Vic Tayback as Mel Sharples, a short-order cook who owns the diner
 Jodie Foster as Audrey, a tomboyish girl with delinquent tendencies
 Harvey Keitel as Ben, a hot-tempered man who assembles gun ammunition for a living
 Murray Moston as Jacobs
 Harry Northup as Joe & Jim's bartender

Director Martin Scorsese cameoed as a customer while Diane Ladd's daughter, future actress Laura Dern, appears as the little girl eating ice cream from a cone in the diner.

Production
Ellen Burstyn was still in the midst of filming The Exorcist when Warner Bros. executives expressed interest in working with her on another project. Burstyn later recalled, "It was early in the woman's movement, and we were all just waking up and having a look at the pattern of our lives and wanting it to be different... I wanted to make a different kind of film. A film from a woman's point of view, but a woman that I recognized, that I knew. And not just myself, but my friends, what we were all going through at the time. So my agent found Alice Doesn't Live Here Anymore... When I read it I liked it a lot. I sent it to Warner Brothers and they agreed to do it. Then they asked who I wanted to direct it. I said that I didn't know, but I wanted somebody new and young and exciting. I called Francis Coppola and asked who was young and exciting and he said 'Go look at a movie called Mean Streets and see what you think.' It hadn't been released yet, so I booked a screening to look at it and I felt that it was exactly what...Alice needed, because [it] was a wonderful script and well written, but for my taste it was a little slick. You know – in a good way, in a kind of Doris Day–Rock Hudson kind of way. I wanted something a bit more gritty."

Burstyn described her collaboration with director Martin Scorsese, making his first Hollywood studio production, as "one of the best experiences I've ever had". The director agreed with his star that the film should have a message. "It's a picture about emotions and feelings and relationships and people in chaos," he said. "We felt like charting all that and showing the differences and showing people making terrible mistakes ruining their lives and then realizing it and trying to push back when everything is crumbling – without getting into soap opera. We opened ourselves up to a lot of experimentation."

The part of Alice was originally offered to Shirley MacLaine. MacLaine turned down the role.  MacLaine admitted in a 2005 interview that she regretted this decision.

Scorsese's casting director auditioned 300 boys for the role of Tommy before they discovered Alfred Lutter. "I met the kid in my hotel room and he was kind of quiet and shy," Scorsese said. But when he paired him with Burstyn and suggested she deviate from the script, he held his own. "Usually, when we were improvising with the kids, they would either freeze and look down or go right back to the script. But this kid, you couldn't shut him up."

The film was shot on location predominantly in and around Tucson, but some scenes were shot in Amado, and Phoenix. A Mel's Diner still exists in Phoenix.

The soundtrack includes "All the Way from Memphis" by Mott the Hoople; "Roll Away the Stone" by Leon Russell; "Daniel" by Elton John; "Jeepster" by T-Rex; and "I Will Always Love You" by Dolly Parton. During her lounge act, Alice sings "Where or When" by Richard Rodgers and Lorenz Hart; "When Your Lover Has Gone" by Einar Aaron Swan; "Gone with the Wind" by Allie Wrubel and Herb Magidson; and "I've Got a Crush on You" by George and Ira Gershwin. In a film clip from Coney Island, Betty Grable is heard singing "Cuddle Up a Little Closer, Lovey Mine" by Otto A. Harbach and Karl Hoschna; and in a film clip from Hello Frisco, Hello, Alice Faye performs "You'll Never Know" by Harry Warren and Mack Gordon.

Reception
Vincent Canby of The New York Times called it a "fine, moving, frequently hilarious tale". He also observed that "the center of the movie and giving it a visible sensibility is Miss Burstyn, one of the few actresses at work today ...who is able to seem appealing, tough, intelligent, funny, and bereft, all at approximately the same moment ...Two other performances must be noted, those of Diane Ladd and Valerie Curtin... Their marvelous contributions in small roles are a measure of the film's quality and of Mr. Scorsese's fully realized talents as one of the best of the new American film-makers." Roger Ebert of the Chicago Sun-Times called the film "one of the most perceptive, funny, occasionally painful portraits of an American woman I've seen." He further wrote: "The movie has been both attacked and defended on feminist grounds, but I think it belongs somewhere outside ideology, maybe in the area of contemporary myth and romance." Ebert placed the film at number 3 of his list of the best films of 1975 (even though the film was released in December 1974). 

Judith Crist of The New Yorker praised Burstyn for "making us care about her in all her incredibilities, stripping the character to its essential warmth as a woman, concerns as a mother, dependencies as a wife, and yearnings as an individual." However, she was critical of Scorsese's direction, writing that he was "putting on a camera show of his own, the handheld pursuit of the image lending an exhausting freneticism to what is melodrama enough on its own." Pauline Kael of The New Yorker wrote,  "Alice is thoroughly enjoyable: funny, absorbing, intelligent even when you don't believe in what's going on--when the issues it raises get all fouled up." TV Guide rated the film three out of four stars, calling it an "effective but uneven work" with performances that "cannot conceal the storyline's shortcomings." Arthur D. Murphy of Variety wrote the film was "a distended bore," saying it "takes a group of well-cast film players and largely wastes them on a smaller-than-life film — one of those 'little people' dramas that makes one despise little people." 

Gene Siskel of the Chicago Tribune gave the film two stars out of four, writing "[t]he characters aren't real, the situations in which they are placed aren't real, and, as a result, one cares little how the alleged relationships develop." Charles Champlin of the Los Angeles Times positively noted Burstyn's performance as "highly charged and sympathetic", and Diane Ladd as "wonderful". However, he felt the film was "seemingly uncertain whether to be a stylized and updating revision of the romantic comedy modes of the late '30s or a rough-and-tumble piece of social realism flavored with bitter comedy." Similarly, Molly Haskell of The Village Voice felt the film was inconsistent in its attempt to "make a 'woman's picture' that will satisfy contemporary audiences' hunger for a heroine of some stature and significance, while at the same time allowing Scorsese to pay ironic tribute to the tear-jerkers and spunky showbiz sagas of the past and such demigoddesses as Alice Faye and Betty Grable." Overall, she felt "the fault is largely that too many cooks have been allowed to contribute their ingredients (they're called 'life moments' and the result is inorganic soup), without a guiding intelligence."

On Rotten Tomatoes, the film has an approval rating of 89% based on 35 reviews, with an average rating of 7.5/10. The website's consensus states: "Alice Doesn't Live Here Anymore finds Martin Scorsese wielding a somewhat gentler palette than usual, with generally absorbing results." On Metacritic, the film has a weighted average score of 78 out of 100, based on 11 critics, indicating "generally favorable reviews".

Accolades

Television adaptation

The film inspired the sitcom Alice, which was broadcast by CBS from August 1976 through July 1985. The only member of the film cast to reprise his role was Vic Tayback as Mel (though his diner was moved to Phoenix). Alfred Lutter portrayed Tommy in the pilot episode but was replaced by Philip McKeon for the series. Diane Ladd joined the show later in its run, but in a role different from that she had played in the film.

Home media
Warner Home Video released the film on Region 1 DVD on August 17, 2004. It is in anamorphic widescreen format with audio tracks in English and French and subtitles in English, French, and Spanish. Bonus features include commentary by Martin Scorsese, Ellen Burstyn, and Kris Kristofferson and Second Chances, a background look at the making of the film.

Book
A book chronicling the development of the film and its spin-off television series entitled Alice: Life Behind the Counter in Mel's Greasy Spoon (A Guide to the Feature Film, the TV Series, and More) was published by BearManor Media in September 2019.

See also
 List of American films of 1974

References

External links

 
 
 
 
 

1974 films
1974 comedy films
1974 drama films
1970s American films
1970s English-language films
1970s feminist films
1970s road comedy-drama films
1970s romantic comedy-drama films
American feminist films
American road comedy-drama films
American romantic comedy-drama films
Best Film BAFTA Award winners
Films about singers
Films about widowhood in the United States
Films adapted into television shows
Films directed by Martin Scorsese
Films featuring a Best Actress Academy Award-winning performance
Films set in New Mexico
Films set in Phoenix, Arizona
Films set in Tucson, Arizona
Films shot in Arizona
Films whose writer won the Best Screenplay BAFTA Award
Warner Bros. films
Films with screenplays by Robert Getchell